Yanybayevo (Yañıbay) is a rural locality (a selo) and the administrative centre of Yanybayevsky Selsoviet, Belokataysky District, Bashkortostan, Russia. The population was 844 as of 2010. There are 13 streets.

Geography 
Yanybayevo is located 19 km northwest of Novobelokatay (the district's administrative centre) by road. Medyatovo is the nearest rural locality.

References 

Rural localities in Belokataysky District